Alexander Craig Gardiner (28 June 1900 – 4 August 1972) was an Australian rules footballer who played for the Footscray Football Club in the Victorian Football League (VFL). His son, also called Alex, also played for Footscray.

Notes

External links 

1900 births
1972 deaths
Australian rules footballers from Victoria (Australia)
Western Bulldogs players
Gisborne Football Club players